Sao Nang Tip Htila (1871 — ?) was a Saopha of Kenghkam State. She was the only female Saopha in Burmese history. She married Hkun Un, Saopha of Kenghkam and became the Mahadevi of Kenghkam. After her husband's death, she became the Saopha in lieu of her adolescent son and became one of the most powerful women in Kenghkam, controlling the State economically and politically. A powerful figure in her own right, she was renowned for her cunning and charisma and admired by her countrymen and the British.

Life
Tip Htila was born in 1871 as the only daughter of Sao Kawng Tai II, Saopha of Kengtung. She had two siblings, an elder brother (Sao Kawn Kham Hpu), and younger brother (Kawng Kiao Intaleng). She was energetic in her youth, which sometimes got her into trouble with her father. In 1887, at 16, her father died and her brother became the 52nd Saopha. She was a skilled horseman and was passionate about fighting. She accompanied the Chiang Hung front line.

Her brother Sao Kawn Kham Hpu died in 1895, and his successor, Kawng Kiao Intaleng, was too young to be Saopha, so she temporarily ruled over Kengtung on his behalf. Two years later, after Kawng Kiao Intaleng acceded to the throne, she married Hkun Un, Saopha of Kenghkam and moved to Kenghkam. She became the Mahadevi of Kengkham. She had a son named Hkun Nawng Hkam. Her husband died when Hkun was 11 and she ruled as the female Saopha for 11 years. Along with Kawng Kiao Intaleng she attended the Delhi Durbar in 1903, in celebration of the coronation of King Edward VII and Queen Alexandra. 

She attended the party of King George V and Queen Mary when they visited British India. Along the way her royal jewellery disappeared, which her maid allegedly tipped overboard. When the time came to meet the Queen in Delhi along with prestigious rulers from across the Kingdom's protectorate, Tip Htila did so without any of her customary adornments, such that Queen Mary commented, "Tip Htila I heard that you came across the sea to honour me but your jewellery was lost" Tip Htila then said, "My jewels are gone, yet I have come to see the King."  Queen Mary was so moved she removed one of her rings and gave it to Tip Htila to wear.

When her son grew up he succeeded her. However, in a fit of pique he shot and killed a servant in the palace. He was then deposed as Saopha and the State of Kengkham State integrated into Mongnai State. 

Tip was a powerful businesswoman, frequently involved in trading elephants and motor cars, and later in teak extraction and road-building. According to Maurice Collis who met her in her old age "In her day she must have been rash, magnificent, as bold as a lion".

References

Tai peoples
1871 births
Date of death missing
Kengtung State